The greater double-collared sunbird (Cinnyris afer) (formerly placed in the genus Nectarinia), is a small bird in the sunbird family.

Distribution and habitat
The sunbird breeds in southern South Africa. It is mainly resident, but partly migratory in the northeast of its range.  It is common in gardens, fynbos, forest edges and coastal scrub.

Description
This sunbird is 14 cm long and exhibits a clear sexual dimorphism. The adult male has a glossy, metallic green head, throat upper breast and back. It has a broad brilliant red band across the chest, separated from the green breast by a narrow metallic blue band. The rest of the underparts are pale grey. When displaying, yellow feather tufts can be seen on the shoulders. The plumage on the female is pale grey, darker in the wings. As with other sunbirds the bill is long and decurved. The bill, legs and feet are black. The eye is dark brown. The male can be distinguished from the similar lesser double-collared sunbird by the latter's smaller size, narrower red chest band and shorter bill.  The call is a hard chut-chut-chut, and the song is a high pitched jumble of tweets and twitters, richer than the calls of the lesser double-collared sunbird.

Behaviour
The sunbird is usually seen singly or in pairs. Its flight is fast and direct on short wings.

Breeding
The sunbird breeds all year round, with a peak from July to November. The closed oval nest is constructed from  grass, lichen and other plant material, bound together with spider webs. It has a side entrance which sometimes has a porch, and is lined with feathers.

Feeding
It lives mainly on nectar from flowers, but takes some fruit, and, especially when feeding young, insects and spiders. It has the habit of hovering in front of webs to extract spiders. It can hover like a hummingbird to take nectar, but usually perches to do so.

Call 
The Greater Double-Collared Sunbird makes a shrill whistle and click: Wrew wrew wrew ch ch.

References

 Sinclair, Hockey and Tarboton, SASOL Birds of Southern Africa,

External links
 Greater double-collared sunbird - Species text in The Atlas of Southern African Birds.
 SASOL e-guide

greater double-collared sunbird
Birds of Southern Africa
greater double-collared sunbird
greater double-collared sunbird